Robert Keyes, nicknamed "Youngie", was a Negro league pitcher in the 1940s.

Keyes made his Negro leagues debut in 1941 with the Memphis Red Sox. He went on to play five seasons with the Red Sox through 1945, and also had a brief stint with the Philadelphia Stars in 1943.

References

External links
 and Baseball-Reference Black Baseball stats and Seamheads

Place of birth missing
Place of death missing
Year of birth missing
Year of death missing
Memphis Red Sox players
Philadelphia Stars players
Baseball pitchers